Jacqueline Gareau (born March 10, 1953) is a Canadian runner who won the Boston Marathon on April 21, 1980.  Gareau led the women's field for most of the race, only to find another runner, Rosie Ruiz, wearing the traditional victor's laurels when she crossed the finish line.  Ruiz was later disqualified after it was determined she had not run the entire race, and Gareau was awarded the victory in a special ceremony one week later.  Her official time for the 1980 marathon, 2:34:28, was the fastest time recorded for a woman in the event's history at the time.

Gareau met Ruiz two years after the marathon as she prepared to run a 10K race in Miami, Florida.  The encounter was brief and Ruiz refused (as she continued to do until her death) to concede that she did not win the 1980 marathon.

Gareau served as the Grand Marshal of the 2005 Boston Marathon and was allowed to "break the tape" in a special ceremony.  She married her former coach, Montreal banker Gilles Lapierre. She has a son, Yannick Lapierre, who participates in Nordic skiing.

Achievements

References

External links
 
 
 
 
 
 
 
 

1953 births
Living people
Canadian female marathon runners
Sportspeople from Quebec
People from Laurentides
Athletes (track and field) at the 1984 Summer Olympics
Olympic track and field athletes of Canada
Boston Marathon female winners
World Athletics Championships athletes for Canada

Canadian female long-distance runners